Anthony Paul Lester, Baron Lester of Herne Hill, QC (3 July 1936 – 8 August 2020) was a British barrister and member of the House of Lords. He was at different times a  member of the Labour Party, Social Democratic Party and the Liberal Democrats. Lester was best known for his influence on race relations legislation in the United Kingdom and as a founder-member of groups such as the Institute of Race Relations, the Campaign Against Racial Discrimination and the Runnymede Trust. Lester was also a prominent figure in promoting birth control and abortion through the Family Planning Association, particularly in Northern Ireland. Lester resigned from the House of Lords after accusations of historic sexual harassment were made by Jasvinder Sanghera.

Early life and education
Lester was born into a Jewish family and was educated at the City of London School. He then studied history and law at Trinity College, Cambridge, and Harvard Law School, graduating with Bachelor of Arts and Master of Laws degrees respectively.

Legal career
Lester was called to the bar at Lincoln's Inn in 1963 and took silk in 1975. In 1987, he was appointed as a recorder and was in office until 1993. As a barrister he worked from 2 Hare Court, latterly named Blackstone Chambers. He was appointed adjunct professor of the Faculty of Law at University College Cork in 2005.

Race relations
In the 1960s and 1970s, Lester was directly involved with the drafting of race relations legislation in Britain. During these periods, he acted as the chair of the legal subcommittee of the Campaign Against Racial Discrimination (C.A.R.D.) and was a member of several organisations working for racial equality such as the Society of Labour Lawyers, Fabian Society, Council of the Institute of Race Relations, British Overseas Socialist Fellowship and the National Committee for Commonwealth Immigrants. In 1968, he co-founded the Runnymede Trust think-tank with Jim Rose. He was chairman of the Runnymede Trust from 1991 to 1993.

Special adviser
Lester was a special adviser to Roy Jenkins at the Home Office in the 1970s, and moved with Jenkins from the Labour Party to found the Social Democratic Party (SDP) in 1981. On 29 June 2007, Lester was appointed by Gordon Brown as a special adviser on constitutional reform to the Secretary of State for Justice. Lester was a member of the Joint Committee on Human Rights.

Family Planning Association
Lester was a patron of the Family Planning Association, previously called the National Birth Control Committee.

Peerage
Lester's peerage was announced on 13 August 1993. He was raised to the peerage as Baron Lester of Herne Hill, of Herne Hill in the London Borough of Southwark, on 13 October 1993. He sat in the Lords as a Liberal Democrat until February 2018, when an allegation of sexual misconduct was made.

On 12 November 2018, the House of Lords Committee for Privileges and Conduct made a recommendation that he be suspended from the House of Lords until June 2022 as a result of a complaint of sexual harassment from Jasvinder Sanghera. On 15 November 2018, by a vote of 101–78, the House of Lords referred the matter back to the Committee for Privileges and Conduct on the ground that the Commissioner for Standards had failed to act in accordance with the principles of natural justice and fairness. After the matter was remitted to the Committee, the Senior Deputy Speaker (the Chairman of the Committee) expressed his disappointment at the decision of the House, saying that the Commissioner had "followed the processes as agreed by the House and that have not been questioned before today." The report of the Commissioner for Standards had responded to various criticisms of the fairness of the process.

Lester resigned from the House of Lords on 12 December 2018. He said that he lacked the strength or health to continue, after the Committee disagreed with the House's conclusion regarding the fairness of the process and renewed the recommendation of his suspension until June 2022. Notwithstanding his retirement, the House subsequently confirmed the Committee's recommendation.

In April 2019, he joined The Independent Group.

Honours 
Lester was elected an international member of the American Philosophical Society in 2003.

Personal life
Lord Lester of Herne Hill is the father of Gideon Lester and of Maya Lester KC.

Lester died on 8 August 2020, at the age of 84.

See also
 Geoffrey Bindman
 Richard Stone (campaigner)
 Jim Rose (journalist)

References

External links
Odysseus Trust – supporting the work of Anthony Lester in the House of Lords

1936 births
2020 deaths
English King's Counsel
English barristers
English Jews
Social Democratic Party (UK) life peers
Lester of Herne Hill
People educated at the City of London School
Alumni of Trinity College, Cambridge
Harkness Fellows
Harvard Law School alumni
Jewish British politicians
Chairs of the Fabian Society
Treasurers of the Fabian Society
Change UK politicians
Members of the American Philosophical Society
Life peers created by Elizabeth II